Coker is a surname shared by several notable people, including:

List of people with the surname
 Ade Coker (born 1954), Nigerian-American footballer
 Adnan Coker (born 1927), Turkish abstract artist
 Alexander Coker (born 1969), United Nations official and inspector
 Ben Coker (born 1989), English footballer
 Bryan Coker, American academic administrator
 Charles W. Coker (born 1933), president and CEO of Sonoco Products Company
 Christopher Coker (born 1964), CEO of the YMCA's in northern Colorado
 Coleman Coker (born 1951), American architect
 Daniel Coker (1780–1846), first American Methodist missionary to the British colony of Sierra Leone
 David Robert Coker (1870–1938), American agricultural reformer
 Dolo Coker (1927–1983), American jazz pianist and composer
 Dorcas Coker-Appiah (born 1946), Ghanaian lawyer and women's rights activist
 Ebenezer Coker London silversmith c 1720.
 Eddie Coker (born 1960), American singer and songwriter of Children's music
 Folake Coker, Nigerian fashion designer
 Folorunsho Coker, Nigerian businessman
 Francis Coker (1878-1963), American political scientist
 Major Frank Coker (1911–1991), American football player and recipient of the Purple Heart
 Gareth Coker (born 1984), British Composer
 G.B.A. Coker (1917-1991), Nigerian jurist
 George Thomas Coker (born 1943), US Navy aviator and prisoner of war during the Vietnam War
 Gylbert Coker, African-American art historian 
 Henry Coker (1919–1979), American jazz trombonist
 Jake Coker, American football player
 Major James Lide Coker (1837–1913), founder of Sonoco Products Company and Coker College
 Jimmie Coker (1936–1991), American baseball catcher
 John Coker (soldier) (1789–1851), hero of the Texas Revolution and founder of Coker, Texas
 John Coker (basketball) (born 1971), American basketball player
 LaMarcus Coker (born 1986), American football player
 Larry Coker (born 1948), football coach, University of Miami
 Paul Coker (born 1929), American illustrator
 Robert Coker (1617–1698), English politician
 Ronald L. Coker (1947–1969), American Marine in the Vietnam War and Medal of Honor recipient
 Scott Coker, American mixed martial arts promoter
 Stephanie Coker, Nigerian television presenter
 Tomm Coker, American comic book artist and film director/writer
 Trevor Coker (1949–1981), New Zealand rower
 Troy Coker (born 1965) Australian rugby union player
 William Chambers Coker (1872–1953), botanist and founder of Coker Arboretum

Part of a compound surname
 Syl Cheney-Coker, Sierra Leone poet, novelist, and journalist
 Justin Mensah-Coker (born 1983), Canadian rugby player
 Nigel Reo-Coker (born 1984), English footballer
 Lanre Towry-Coker, Nigerian architect and politician

See also
 Coker (disambiguation)
 Cook (surname)